Qasem-Ali Zahir Nejad  (1924 – 13 October 1999) was a major general in the Army of Iran after the 1979 Iranian Revolution.

Zahirnejad began studies in the Military University (Imam Ali) in 1951. He retired from the army in 1976 as a colonel. After the 1979 revolution he returned to the army at the beginning of the unrest in Kurdistan and in 1979 as commander of Division 64 of Urmia. In 1980 he was promoted to brigadier general to command the Iranian Gendarmerie and Army. On 9 October 1981 was promoted to the position of President of the Joint Chiefs of Staff.

During the Iran–Iraq War, his insistent implementation of military army commanders and regular tactics led to clashes with the Iranian Revolutionary Guard Corps, a branch of the Iranian armed forces that relies on the use of mostly light infantry together with some armored equipment as well as unorthodox military tactics. He achieved the rank of major general on 6 November 1989. In 1999 he died of a stroke.

See also 
 List of Iranian two-star generals since 1979

References

Sources
 امیر سرلشگر ظهیرنژاد که بود؟

1924 births
1999 deaths
Islamic Republic of Iran Army major generals
People from Ardabil
Islamic Republic of Iran Army personnel of the Iran–Iraq War
Commanders of Islamic Republic of Iran Army Ground Force
Iranian Gendarmerie personnel